Women in Congress may refer to:

 Women in the United States House of Representatives
 Women in the United States Senate
 Women in the Indian National Congress; see All India Mahila Congress

See also
 Women in the Senate (disambiguation)
 Women in Parliament (disambiguation)
 Women in the House (disambiguation)
 Women in House of Representatives (disambiguation)
 Women in government
 Assemblywomen (play)
 Congresswomen